Geani Mihai Crețu (born 12 January 2000) is a Romanian professional footballer who plays as a central midfielder for Liga I club FC Argeș Pitești, on loan from Dinamo București. He made his debut in Liga I on 15 December 2018, in a match between Dinamo București and Universitatea Craiova, ended with the score of 3-0.

Career statistics

Club

References

External links
 
 
 Geani Crețu at lpf.ro

2000 births
Living people
Sportspeople from Piatra Neamț
Romanian footballers
Association football midfielders
CSM Ceahlăul Piatra Neamț players
Liga I players
Liga II players
FC Dinamo București players
FC Rapid București players
FC Argeș Pitești players